Ross Burkinshaw (born 10 August 1986) is an English former professional boxer who has won the British Boxing Board of Control (BBBofC) English Super flyweight title,  bantamweight Commonwealth title beating Jason Cunningham and WBO European bantamweight Title. He has been a challenger for the BBBofC super flyweight title against Lee Haskins, the BBBofC English bantamweight title against Craig Lyon, and the BBBofC Central (England) Area super bantamweight title against Gavin McDonnell.

Before turning professional Ross had 55 amateur bouts, and also reached the finals of the ABA's in 2005.

Professional record

https://commons.wikimedia.org/wiki/File:The_champ.jpg

References

External links
 Official website
 

1986 births
Living people
Bantamweight boxers
English male boxers
Sportspeople from Sheffield
Super-flyweight boxers